Munzur Çem (born Hüseyin Beysülen; 1945 – 11 December 2022) was a Kurdish writer and journalist who published a number of publications on various topics pertaining to Kurds. His work includes a collection of interviews of survivors and descendants of the Dersim massacre conducted in 1999.

Biography 
Çem was born in Kiğı in 1945 and went to school in Nazımiye. He graduated as a health officer in 1971. During his education, he published newspaper articles and in school and later for a Kurdish newspaper in Ankara. In 1977, Çem founded the newspaper Roja Welat but the ban on the Kurdish language impeded him from publishing. When the newspaper Dengê Komkarî was founded in 1979 by Kurdish migrants in Germany, Çem became a contributor from the beginning. Çem later moved to Sweden in 1984.

Bibliography

Books

Periodical articles

References 

1945 births
2022 deaths
People from Kiğı
Kurdish writers
20th-century Kurdish people